Moinuddin Haider, HI(M) (Urdu: معین الدین حیدر ; born 5 June 1942) is a retired three-star rank general of the Pakistan Army, who later served as the Governor of Sindh and then as the Federal Interior Minister of Pakistan. Governor's rule was also imposed in Sindh during his tenure.

Army career
Haider was commissioned in the Pakistan Army in 1962 first in the 26th PMA Long Course in the Frontier Force Regiment. He earned his master's degree in defence studies from the Royal College of Defence Studies in Seaford House UK, and was the first Pakistani to get his thesis published in Seaford House Papers.

He saw action in the 1965 and the 1971 Indo-Pak wars. He served as instructor at the Pakistan Military Academy from 1967 to 1970. He commanded a reconnaissance and support battalion twice in 1975–77 and in 1981–82. Later he was head of Pakistan Mutual Cooperation Group in Somalia from 1978 to 1981. Subsequently, he served as GSO-I operations and colonel staff in an infantry division.He also served as Martial Law Administrator of Northern Sindh, and Director General Military Training.

Senior command and staff appointments
Promoted to brigadier in 1983, he left for the UK to attend Royal College of Defence Studies course in 1984 and was the first Pakistani officer whose thesis was published in Seaford House papers. He was appointed director military training at GHQ in 1986 and was closely associated with planning of Zarb-e-Momin.

As a two-star, Haider commanded the 33rd Infantry Division at Quetta from 1989 to 1991. He then stayed as the Deputy Chief of General Staff (DCGS) at the GHQ from 1991 to 1993. After becoming a three-star general, he first served as the adjutant general (AG) from 1993 to 1996, and then as the Corps Commander Lahore from 1996 to 1997. In the last days of his tenure as Cor Commander Lahore he was appointed Governor Sindh.

Government service
After retirement in March 1997, he was installed as the governor of Sindh province by the Nawaz Sharif government. He continued to serve as the governor until June 1999 when he was replaced by Mamnoon Hussain. At the onset of military coup in October 1999, General Pervez Musharraf, a junior to Haider as he belonged to 29th PMA Long Course, put Haider as the Federal Interior Minister of Pakistan. He continued to lead the powerful ministry until the 2002 October elections, when Faisal Saleh Hayat replaced him. During his time as Interior Minister he was very involved in hunting down and bringing to justice the killers of American Wall Street Journal reporter Daniel Pearl. During his incumbency he was also involved in crackdown against militants and banned organisations, which led to the assassination of his brother in Karachi. During his tenure his work was not just limited to his ministry, but he also played a major role in foreign relations, visiting several countries and interacting with heads of states. 

Moinuddin Haider is the graduate of PAF Public School Lower Topa and is the current patron in chief of the Lower Topa Old Boys Association (LOBA). He is currently Chariman of Fatimid Foundation. He has also adopted several schools and is on the board of many universities and colleges. He continues to appear on the media frequently and his name was on top of the list issued by ISPR for representation on media. He is married and has three children.

References

External links
Biography of Moinuddin Haider
Profile at National Police Bureau
Interview of Lt Gen (retd) Moinuddin Haider

 

Pakistani generals
Governors of Sindh
Interior ministers of Pakistan
Living people
1942 births
Muhajir people
Academic staff of Pakistan Military Academy